Tim Chisholm (born October 31, 1969) is a semi-retired American real tennis player.  He is Racquets Director at The Tuxedo Club in Tuxedo Park, New York.

Career
A former lawn tennis player, Chisholm switched to the original game of tennis around the year 2000.  He became the head professional at the Racquet and Tennis Club in New York City. In 2001, he won the first World Doubles Championship, partnered by Julian Snow.  Although technically not a Grand Slam, at one point in 2003 Chisholm held all four major open titles at the same time.

Chisholm challenged former World Champion Robert Fahey three times for the singles title.  The 2002 challenge was the closest, going the full 13 sets.  In 2004, Chisholm lost the challenge 7–1 sets.  He then retired as head professional at the Racquet Club and took an office job in Boston, Massachusetts, only playing in American tournaments.  In January 2006, he decided to attempt the World Challenge again, and although he won his preliminary matches handily, he fell to Fahey 7–0 in the championship.

On June 7, 2015, Chisholm and doubles partner Camden Riviere defeated World Doubles champions, Australians Robert Fahey and Steve Virgona.

Personal life
Chisholm is married to Darcey and they have three children.

Singles titles
 Australian Open: 2003
 British Open: 2002
 French Open: 2003
 U.S. Open: 2003, 2004
 Schochet Cup (formerly U.S. Professional): 2002

See also
 List of real tennis world champions

References

1969 births
Living people
American real tennis players